

Women's 800 m Freestyle - Final

Women's 800 m Freestyle - Heats

Women's 800 m Freestyle - Heat 01

Women's 800 m Freestyle - Heat 02

800 metres freestyle
2006 in women's swimming